Casalino  is an Italian surname. Notable people with the surname include:

 Domenico Casalino (born 1962), Italian executive
 Lisa Casalino (born 1972), American jazz singer and songwriter
 Roberto Casalino (born 1979), Italian singer-songwriter

See also
 Casalino

Italian-language surnames